Dino Abbrescia (born Bernardo Abbrescia; 18 August 1966) is an Italian actor. He appeared in more than forty films since 1998.

Selected filmography

References

External links 

1966 births
Living people
Italian male film actors